Collective enfranchisement is a legal term in English property law used to describe a process whereby leaseholders of a block of flats of apartments can buy out their freeholder.  The right to collective enfranchisement was granted by the Leasehold Reform Housing and Urban Development Act 1993.

See also
English land law

References

English land law